Peters may refer to:

People
 Peters (surname)
 Peters Band, a First Nations band in British Columbia, Canada

Places

United States
 Peters, California, a census-designated place
 Peters, Florida, a town
 Peters Township, Kingman County, Kansas
 Peters, an unincorporated community in Casco Township, St. Clair County, Michigan
 Peters Township, Franklin County, Pennsylvania
 Peters Township, Washington County, Pennsylvania
 Peters, Texas, an unincorporated area
 Peters Mountain, in Virginia and West Virginia
 Peters Glacier (Alaska Range), Alaska
 Peters Glacier (Brooks Range), Alaska
 Peters Canyon, Orange County, California
 Peters Reservation, Massachusetts, a nature reserve
 Peters Park (Boston)
 Peters River, in Massachusetts and Rhode Island
 Peters Brook (disambiguation)
 Peters Creek (California)
 Peters Creek (Pennsylvania)

Elsewhere
 Peters Peak, Ross Dependency, Antarctica
 Peters Butte, Marie Byrd Land, Antarctica
 Peters Glacier (South Georgia), South Georgia Island, Atlantic Ocean
 Peters Road, Chennai, Tamil Nadu, India
 Peters (crater), on the Moon
 Peters Bay, NE Greenland

In business
 Edition Peters, a German music publishing house, also known as C.F. Peters Musikverlag
 Peters (bakery) a bakery chain in the United Kingdom
 Peters Bookselling Services, a specialist children's bookseller in Birmingham UK
 Peters Cartridge Company, a former gunpowder and ammunition producer in Kings Mills, Ohio
 Peters Fashions, a family-run department store in Huddersfield, West Yorkshire, England
 Peters Ice Cream, an Australian ice cream brand now owned by Nestlé

See also
 Peter's Food Services, a Welsh food company
 Peters Bastion, a mountain in Palmer Land, Antarctica
 Peters Dome, a mountain in Alaska
 Peter (disambiguation)
 Justice Peters (disambiguation)